"The Merry Month of May" is a poem by Thomas Dekker (c. 1572–1632), an English Elizabethan dramatist and pamphleteer. "The Merry Month of May" is a part of Dekker's play, The Shoemaker's Holiday, first performed in 1599. In Ernest Rhys's 1887 publication of Dekker's work, he titled the poem The First Three-Men's Song.

The poem is included within Act 3 Scene V of the play.

Text

References

External links

1599 poems
Poetry by Thomas Dekker (writer)